The 2017 TCR Ibérico Touring Car Series season was the first season of the TCR Iberico Touring Car Series, a merger of the TCR Spain and TCR Portugal series. The championship started at Autódromo do Estoril in Portugal on 30 April and ended at  Algarve International Circuit in Portugal on 22 October.

Teams and drivers
Hankook is the official tyre supplier.

Calendar and results
The 2017 schedule was announced on 8 November 2016, with four event in Portugal and three events in Spain. The Portuguese rounds will count towards the TCR Portugal standings, while the Spanish rounds will cound towards the TCR Spain standings. An overall title will also be available.

Championship standings

TCR Ibérico Touring Car Series

Drivers' championship

Scoring systems

† – Drivers did not finish the race, but were classified as they completed over 75% of the race distance.

Class 2

TCR Portugal Touring Car Championship

Drivers' championship

† – Drivers did not finish the race, but were classified as they completed over 75% of the race distance.

TCR Spain Touring Car Championship

Drivers' championship

† – Drivers did not finish the race, but were classified as they completed over 75% of the race distance.

References

External links
 
 
 

Ibérico Touring Car Series
2017 in Portuguese motorsport
2017 in Spanish motorsport